Jayson Breitenbach (born 12 May 1998) is a German professional footballer who plays as a right-back for Kickers Offenbach.

References

External links
 
 

1998 births
Living people
German footballers
People from Gelnhausen
Sportspeople from Darmstadt (region)
Footballers from Hesse
Association football fullbacks
1. FSV Mainz 05 II players
1. FC Saarbrücken players
Kickers Offenbach players
Regionalliga players
3. Liga players